Endovelicus (Portuguese: Endouellicus, Endovélico; Spanish: Endovélico, Enobólico) is the best known of the pre-Roman Lusitanian and Celtiberian  gods of the Iron Age. He was originally a chthonic god. He was the God/Lord of the Underworld and of health, prophecy and the earth, associated with vegetation and the afterlife. Later accepted by the Romans themselves, who assimilated it to Pluto or to Serapis and made him a relatively popular god.

Endovelicus has a temple in São Miguel da Mota in Alentejo, Portugal, and there are numerous inscriptions and ex-votos dedicated to him in the Museu Etnológico de Lisboa (the Ethnological Museum of Lisbon); possible toponyms include Andévalo in Spain. The cult of Endovelicus prevailed until the 5th century, just when Christianity was spreading in the region.

Etymology
In the last two centuries of scholarship, several etymologies have been proposed to Endovelicus's name.

In the 19th century, António da Visitação Freire classified it as a mixed Celtic and Phoenician name, adapted to the Roman language. The End- radical would be from Celtic languages; Bel (or Vel-) would be Phoenician for 'Lord' and -Cus is a usual word termination in Latin. José Leite de Vasconcelos believed the word Endovellicus was an originally Celtic title Andevellicos, meaning 'very good'.

An alternate reading derives the word velicus from the Celtic vailos ("wolf"). Wolves were symbolic animals to the god.

A more recently proposed possibility suggests a loanword from proto-Basque, from the *bels root. In this case the original name would have been *Endo-belles, "most black", fitting his chthonic characteristics.

Temples and cult
There were several places where his cult could be observed:

In the municipality of Alandroal, there is the Santuário da Rocha da Mina (Mina's Rock Sanctuary); some authors classify it as a temple of Endovelicus. It is the only known place of this kind in Southern Portugal. Near the temple, we can find the Lucefecit rivulet that has been associated with Lucifer since the Middle Ages. Lucifer was the name used by the Romans for the Morning star and the goddess Venus. Some authors connect the name of the rivulet with the meaning of the place as being the "Glimpse of Light". A kilometer away, there is a sacred fountain that is said to be more ancient than the temple; its waters are still considered medicinal.

The temple is rocky and hemmed in by a rocky formation that protects the site and the chiselled flooring is often related to Roman sacrificial altars. This sort of monument is not uncommon in the North of Portugal and on the Spanish Meseta.

Leite de Vasconcelos mentions that the site was used by the inhabitants of the Roman empire from all walks of life. Several inscriptions suggest that the temple of Endovelicus was used as an oracle. One of the inscriptions states: EX IMPERATO AVERNO. Leite de Vasconcelos translated this as “segundo a determinação que emanou de baixo" (by the determination that emanated from below) suggesting that there is a similarity to the Temple of Apollo at Delphi. Steam would emanate from below, deep within the earth, and bestow clairvoyance. Vasconcelos also suggests that believers practiced the incubatio, sleeping at the site, hoping for dreams they could interpret later.

In Castro of Ulaca in Province of Ávila, a city of the Vettones, a sanctuary dedicated to Vaelicus has been discovered. The name could be related to Endovelicus.

The most notable sanctuary hypothetically dedicated to Endovelicus, is the Roman Sanctuary of Panóias in Vila Real, Trás-os-Montes, with a complex system of "sinks" bearing Roman inscriptions. Nearby, in Cabeço de São Miguel da Mota, another temple dedicated to Endovelicus was built and, on its ruins, the Alans built or readapted the previous temple, a sanctuary dedicated to Saint Michael (São Miguel in Portuguese). The Muslims transformed the temple into a mosque, and with the Reconquista the temple was once again made a Christian temple. In 1559 the temple was still somewhat well preserved when the Cardinal Henrique ordered 96 marble columns to be removed from the place to build the Colégio do Espírito Santo in Évora. From the building only the staging remained. But archaeological forays have turned up pottery and amphorae as well as votive altars dedicated to Endovelicus, and lead to the discovery of several architectural elements, among them the "sinks" made in the rocks. The sinks suggests the existence of rituals, animal sacrifice and, possibly, feasts of a ritual nature.

See also 
Lusitanian mythology
List of deities

References 

Loução, Paulo Alexandre: Portugal, Terra de Mistérios, Ésquilo, 2000 (third edition).
 Vasconcellos, José Leite de. Religiões da Lusitania na parte que principalmente se refere a Portugal. Lisboa: Imprensa nacional, 1897. pp. 111-145.

Further reading

 Grenier, Albert. "Le dieu lusitanien Endovellicvs". In: Études Celtiques, vol. 6, fascicule 1, 1952. pp. 195-197. DOI: https://doi.org/10.3406/ecelt.1952.1252; www.persee.fr/doc/ecelt_0373-1928_1952_num_6_1_1252
 Ledo Caballero, A. C. (2017). "Niger fluvius: aguas oscuras y dioses infernales. El caso de Endovélico". In: Hispania Sacra, 69(139), 7–17. https://doi.org/10.3989/hs.2017.001
 Parrilla, José María González. "Endovélicus, un dios minero para una comarca". In: El Andévalo, paisajes y humanidad: Actas de las V Jornadas de Patrimonio del Andévalo. Valverde del Camino, 21, 22 y 23 de noviembre de 2014. 2015, pp. 51-63. .
 Ribeiro, José Cardim. "O "Deus Sanctus Endovellicus" durante a romanidade ¿uma interpretatio local de "Faunus Silvanus"?". In: Palaeohispánica: Revista sobre lenguas y culturas de la Hispania antigua (Ejemplar dedicado a: Actas del IX coloquio sobre lenguas y culturas paleohispánicas (Barcelona, 20-24 de octubre de 2004)), Nº. 5, 2005. pp. 721-766. .
 Schattner, Thomas; Guerra, Amílcar; Fabião, Carlos. "Die Idealköpfe des Endovellicus - ein Zwischenbilanz". In: Gaggadis-Robin, V.; Hermary, A.; Reddé, M.; Sintes, C., Actes du X Colloque International sur l'Art provincial Roman. Aix-en-Provence: 2009. pp. 483-494. .

 On epigraphy
 Gaspar, Catarina (2020). “The Endovellicus Sanctuary in Portugal: An Example of Language Variation Throughout Votive Inscriptions in Latin”. In: Acta Classica Universitatis Scientiarum Debreceniensis 55 (August): 59–73. https://doi.org/10.22315/ACD/2019/4.
 Ordozgoiti, David Serrano. "Ara de mármol en honor de Endovélico procedente de San Miguel de Mota (Évora)". In: Boletín del Archivo Epigráfico, Nº. 3, 2019, pp. 52-57. .
 Schattner, Thomas G. “Men, Women, Children, Animals: The Votive Statuary from the Sanctuary of Endovellicus at São Miguel Da Mota/Alandroal (Portugal)”. In: The Archaeology of Roman Portugal in Its Western Mediterranean Context. Edited by Tesse D. Stek and André Carneiro, Oxbow Books, 2022. pp. 257–73. JSTOR, https://doi.org/10.2307/j.ctv2v6pcq1.18. Accessed 21 Oct. 2022.

Earth gods
Health gods
Lusitanian gods
Gallaecian gods
Oracular gods
Roman gods
Underworld gods